The videography of American rapper and record producer Travis Scott consists 15 music videos as a lead artist, and 11 television appearances.

Music videos

Television appearances

References

Discographies of American artists
Videographies of American artists